Lee Kyung-jin is a South Korean actress. She is known for her roles in dramas such as Working Mom Parenting Daddy, Joseon Survival Period, Through the Waves, Amor Fati and Three Bold Siblings. She also appeared in movies Love in Magic, Almost Love, 26 Years Diary, Love Forecast and Ayla: The Daughter of War.

Filmography

Television series

Film

Awards and nominations

References

External links 
 
 

1956 births
20th-century South Korean actresses
Living people
21st-century South Korean actresses
South Korean television actresses
South Korean film actresses